Rufus the Bobcat is the mascot for the Ohio Bobcats. Ohio University revealed the new mascot during a ceremony before the Bobcats' victory over Tennessee-Martin on September 2, 2006.  At the suggestion of a university alumnus, Michael Massa, Class Of 1982, a university-wide contest to name the bobcat took place in 2006. The unveiling ceremony began with a video of the mascot interacting with the football team and head coach Frank Solich, culminating with Rufus roaring into Peden Stadium on a Harley-Davidson motorcycle. In 2018, after an international space conference had been held on campus, Rufus the Bobcat was the first college mascot's name to venture into deep outer space aboard an unmanned NASA spacecraft, carrying a CD library of names.
In 2020, Ohio University launched its first actual space satellite "Bobcat-1" aboard  
NASA's Antares rocket, to the international space station.

Nomenclature 

In early 2006, Ohio University alumnus Michael A Massa, a communications graduate, penned a letter to the athletics department suggesting that the university provide a proper name and identity to the generic bobcat mascot, for branding purposes. The university Athletic Department then held a campus-wide competition to select a formal name. There were more than 500 submissions nominated for the name of the new Bobcat in May. Fans then participated in a naming contest on www.ohiobobcats.com from June through August, the chosen name of the Bobcats' new mascot was Rufus.  The winner of the naming contest, Alicia Lagana (BSJ '90, MS '92, now Alicia Anderson-Lasker) of Hilliard Ohio,  was recognized at the Ohio University home game versus Bowling Green on September 30, 2006.

Rufus was the popular choice for many fans because Lynx rufus is the species name for the bobcat. Other fans made the connection with Rufus Putnam, who presided over the meeting to form the Ohio Company of Associates that resulted in the founding of Ohio University.  Rufus Putnam was also on the first board of trustees at the university from 1804 to 1824, and was given the honor with the naming of Putnam Hall in 1926.

In October 2014, coinciding with a major space conference being held on campus, Rufus the Bobcat was the first college mascot name to venture into deep interstellar space, after his name was submitted by Michael Massa to be included among the names of other individuals on a registry to be transported on board the Mars regionally bound Orion NASA test Spacecraft.  In 2017, Rufus' name was also included on the actual NASA spacecraft entitled  "Insight",  which was slated to land on Mars, being the first university mascot's name to be included in the voyage to another planet.

Ohio Bobcats and mascots 
In 1925, the members of the Ohio Athletic Board thought of an official nickname for Ohio University to replace "Ohio," the "Green and White" and "The Nameless Wonders." The board members decided to begin a contest soliciting name suggestions for the Athletic teams of Ohio University and offered a $10 prize for the suggestion that best showed the fighting spirit of Ohio. Hundreds of ideas poured in, but it was "Bobcat," suggested by Hal H. Rowland, a former student and Athens resident, that suggested the winning name.  The bobcat's regal stature in Appalachia made its selection a highlight of Ohio University's strategic partnership with the region.

That day, the Ohio football team overcame archrival Miami with a 21–0 victory. They went on to achieve arguably the university's greatest football season ever. The Bobcats finished 10–0 that year and were voted the NCAA National College Division Champion.

The task of designing the Bobcat mascot costume was given to Tom Schantz. The outfit he created included a very green hand-knit sweater with 'OHIO' emblazoned in white across the front, and was literally topped off by a large papier-mâché head made in France. The question of who would wear the costume was complicated by the fact that the suit was hot, confining and had awkward dimensions. Dan Nichols, class of '63, was the first Bobcat mascot and began the tradition that the person donning the costume must live in Lincoln Hall, a tradition that lasted for several decades. The Campus Affairs Committee decided that the Bobcat mascot would be a permanent member of the cheerleading squad and would be present at all football and basketball games. A permanent life-size sculpture of The Bobcat is located in front of the Sook Athletic Center, Peden Stadium.

Rufus has transcended his courtside profile further by becoming a beacon of spirit for alumni, charities, and university campaigns.

Brutus tackling 

On September 18, 2010, the Bobcats football team played the Ohio State Buckeyes in Columbus. As the Buckeyes were running onto the field, Brandon Hanning, dressed as Rufus, charged into the field. Hanning sideswiped and attempted to tackle Brutus Buckeye, but was unsuccessful and ended up losing his Bobcat head in the process. Upon returning to his feet, Hanning donned the head again, then ran after Brutus and jumped on his back and continued to hit the mascot in the head. Hanning was then pulled aside by security who told him to cut it out. The incident garnered national attention.  Neither of the mascots were injured during the event. After the game, Hanning was terminated from his position as Ohio's mascot, and was banned from attending Ohio home athletic events.  The game score went 43–7 in the Buckeyes' favor.

In a post-game interview, Hanning explained that this was his sole purpose in trying out to be the mascot. "It was actually my whole plan to tackle Brutus when I tried out to be mascot," Hanning explained, "I tried out about a year ago, and the whole reason I tried out was so I could come up here to Ohio State and tackle Brutus."   While many thought this was Rufus' first offense against rival school's mascots, Hanning stated "Before this, I actually got in a fight with the Buffalo mascot. He's a bull. I started it. I was thinking I should go ahead and try out tackling another mascot. I brought a red square cape thing, like in a bullfight. He was just playing around, acting like he was charging me. I tackled him and put him on the ground. It was pretty funny. No one got upset because it wasn't Ohio State."

Following the game the Columbus Dispatch published a cartoon of a scrawny Brutus mascot lifting weights next to a picture of their next opponent's mascot in reference to being taken by surprise by Rufus the game before.

References

External links 
https://web.archive.org/web/20130119045518/http://www.ohiobobcats.com/trads/ohio-trads.html
http://www.ohioalumni.org/bobcats-mascots

Ohio Bobcats
Mid-American Conference mascots
Feline mascots